Ramazanov is a masculine surname of Arabic origin, its feminine counterpart is Ramazanova. It may refer to
Aghabala Ramazanov (born 1993), Azerbaijani football player 
Alikhan Ramazanov (born 1976), Russian football player
Larisa Ramazanova (born 1971), Russian-Belarusian race walker
Murad Ramazanov (born 1974), Russian wrestler
Murad Ramazanov (footballer) (born 1979), Russian football player
Ramazan Ramazanov (born 1984), Russian kickboxer
Zaur Ramazanov (born 1976), Azerbaijani football player 
Zemfira (Zemfira Ramazanova), Russian singer